Hare and Loathing in Las Vegas is a 2004 Bugs Bunny cartoon short, which co-starred Yosemite Sam. It was directed by Peter Shin and Bill Kopp, and produced by Warner Bros. Animation.

The cartoon was never released theatrically (due to the poor box-office performance of the 2003 animated film, Looney Tunes: Back in Action); it was initially released on the Australian DVD release of Looney Tunes: Back in Action (from which Sam reprises his role as a casino owner) and was later included in The Essential Bugs Bunny DVD set.

The title is a parody of Hunter S. Thompson's book Fear and Loathing in Las Vegas and its film of the same name.

Plot
Bugs is living in his rabbit hole that is just outside of Las Vegas, when Yosemite Sam builds a casino over it. Being given the option to gamble or get out, Bugs tries his luck. At every game he plays (blackjack, roulette, slot machines) he wins in surprising and spectacular fashion, much to Sam's consternation. By the time he leaves with a sum total of $8,042,123,297.55 (more money comes out of Sam, as if he was another slot machine), Sam is down to his last quarter (which Bugs will be back for that). After reprimanding a group of cheaters, tells them that lucky medals, four-leaf clovers, horseshoes, or rabbit's feet are not allowed, and realizes that he has been hornswoggled. Bugs has meanwhile used his newfound riches to buy a luxury hotel suite. Sam follows him shooting and Bugs quickly wins a prize car to outrace him; Sam, meanwhile, drives a giant pirate ship, complete with cannons. The two race out of Las Vegas and eventually make it to the Hoover Dam. There is a conveniently placed slot machine, which Sam uses his last quarter to play. He "wins", but the screen reads H2O, causing the dam to burst. Sam phones Bugs, who is atop the now empty dam, to tell him, "I hate you, rabbit."

Voice cast
 Joe Alaskey as Bugs Bunny
 Jeff Bennett as Yosemite Sam
 Maurice LaMarche and Tress MacNeille as Additional voices

See also
 List of Bugs Bunny cartoons
 List of Yosemite Sam cartoons

References

External links
 

2004 films
2004 animated films
2004 short films
2000s American animated films
2000s animated short films
Films based on folklore
Films directed by Bill Kopp
Bugs Bunny films
Porky Pig films
Films set in the Las Vegas Valley
Films set in Mohave County, Arizona
Films about gambling
Looney Tunes shorts
Warner Bros. Animation animated short films
2000s Warner Bros. animated short films
Yosemite Sam films
2000s English-language films